Sleep Room are an English alternative rock band from Reading, Berkshire who have attracted attention from Berkshire's music community Josaka and the BBC who have noted them for their original sound, epic soundscapes and emotive style.

Sleep Room are a relatively reclusive band whose sporadic and extraordinary live performances have won them acclaim and a small cult following. To date, Sleep Room have made three albums, attracting endorsement by Planet Sound and BBC radio, while winning praise for their performance at the charity event Oxjam in Reading. Their influences include a diverse range of bands, most notably Joy Division, Sigur Rós, Elbow and Pink Floyd. Sleep Room take their name from the conspiratorial brainwashing technique allegedly used by the CIA in the early 1970s Project MKUltra, which involved sensory deprivation and sub-conscious behavioural response to sound.

History
The founding members of Sleep Room, Nigel Weston and Ryan Cook, met on Berkshire's online music community Josaka, and following the break-up of Weston's earlier unnamed band, the two auditioned for drummers and bassists, eventually being impressed by Richard King's John Bonham-esque dynamics.

Formation and first recording (2001–2002)
Along with then bass player Oli Griffiths, Sleep Room made their debut performance at The Grey Horse in Kingston, earning a return headline booking.

Following a number of gigs in and around Berkshire, Sleep Room embarked on a not so successful recording project at Sound Machine Studios in Fleet, owned a run by a friend of Griffith's.

While the record Rat's May Dream Of Maze was good enough to be given a rave review on Planet Sound, band members Weston, Cook and King felt let down by the quality and effort of the studio, feeling Griffiths and compatriot were more interested in intoxication than recording. Despite this, the record sold well, and Sleep Room began to refine their sound, working hard on new music and gigging in Guildford, Reading and Bracknell. In 2003 however, after an extended period of tension and artistic differences, Sleep Room and Oli Griffiths parted company.

Weston, Cook and King overhauled the Sleep Room sound and began developing a more challenging catalogue of sounds while keeping an eye out for a replacement bass player.

Shut Window's, Draw Curtain's, and acclaim (2003–2006)
While drinking in The Hope and Anchor, a pub in Wokingham, Cook came in contact with Griffiths' replacement David Treasure; a talented session musician looking to be part of something more creative than his regular fee-paying cover band work. Treasure joined the band, and following a short live stint in Reading, Sleep Room were ready with their developed sound, and new progressive material. In 2004 Sleep Room once again stepped into the recording studio, this time opting for the professional services of producer and engineer Lewis Childs and Earth Terminal in Odiham.

The record, Shut Windows, Draw Curtains, was received to critical acclaim, attracting attention from BBC radio, getting regular airplay on BBC Radio Berkshire and even Gideon Coe's radio show on BBC Radio 6 where their song "Patriot" won "Download of the month" With a darker and more complex sound, the record housed some long pieces, notably the outstandingly accomplished tracks "Dave & Sarah", and "Brand New Day".

Sleep Room were on a roll, and after another successful if sporadic run of live performances, they were back in the studio to record their new collection of tracks, the album - It Still Moves All The Same. This proved to be their breakthrough, and amongst even more critical acclaim, Sleep Room attracted support gigs for then signed Reading act The Cooper Temple Clause among others, and a chance to feature in the national music event the Oxjam Festival and even selling albums in America.

The now distinct Sleep Room sound was captured fantastically by Childs once again at Earth Terminal, featuring some strange recording techniques. In their single "The Souvenir", a song penned in reference to the anxiety suffered by his friend during a break-up, Cook was made to stand in the roof of the barn to sing into the rafters, while Weston had his guitar kicked to spark strange atmospherics. Cook sang the entire lead vocal to the haunting "Mechanical Republic" standing outside in a field, buffeted by wind and rain.

Reduction to trio (2007–2008)
However, in 2006 Sleep Room were to lose their second bass player. Treasure disappeared while Cook, Weston and King were only to hear on the grapevine rumours that he had "hung up his bass" and run off to Australia.

Distressed by the disappearance of their friend and colleague, Sleep Room continued to write and perform as a three piece, feeling replacing their troubled bassist was a tough task to face. Re-writing much of their catalogue to incorporate the bass-lines into Weston's and Cook's guitar pieces, Sleep Room's sound began to evolve this time through necessity rather than choice. Weston's usually free guitar was now slightly restrained by bass duties, and Cook's guitar sound was worked on to produce deeper and fuller tones. However, rather than hamper the sound, the band grew stronger for it. Weston was inspired to write razor-sharp and technical riffs as opposed to the liberated atmospherics of previous albums, and Cook managed to engineer a sound for his guitar that ended up more resembling a distorted string section in an orchestra than a guitar. Peculiarly, both Weston and Cook began to swap roles, Weston rooting the songs with rhythmic riffery while Cook provided overdubs of solo-esque instrumental sections and atmospherics. The band continued to exist as a three piece until late 2008, when they finally decided that while it worked without a bass, it would only be better with one.

Three become four again (2008-2009)
Alex Bowen auditioned for the band and the band was instantly impressed, for he learned most of the catalogue in a very short period of time and applied his own unique style to the music. Bowen tightened up the newly written, previously bass-less tracks, and inspired several new songs with music of his own. Bowen made his live debut in The Three Bee's, Reading and the gig was a success. Following a number of gigs around Reading, Bowen and Sleep Room began to write their fourth studio album.

Entering Earth Terminal for a third time, Lewis Childs and Sleep Room recorded and mixed the five song EP Gone in three days. The album features a honed Sleep Room style; while the epic and progressive nature is retained, the songs have become more compact. Still experimental in structure, and unique in sound, Sleep Room have produced something which is accessible as well as thought provoking.

Members 
 Nigel Weston – guitar 1, synthesiser
 Ryan Cook – guitar 2, vocals
 Richard King – drums and percussion
 Alex Bowen – bass guitar
 Jonathan Amphlett - guitar 2, synthesiser

Discography 
Rat's May Dream Of Maze (2002)
 "Everything You Know Is Wrong"
 "Odium"
 "Smile Show"
 "Video"
 "Hearing Sunlight"

Shut Windows, Draw Curtains (2004)
 "Dave & Sarah"
 "Patriot"
 "Monkey Board"
 "Dub"
 "Brand New Day"

It Still Moves All The Same (2007)
 "The Souvenir"
 "Groupthinkerror"
 "Ananias"
 "Toy Boy" (cover of Sinitta's hit song)
 "The 12th of Spring"
 "Mechanical Republic"

Gone (2010)
 "Species"
 "Temper Temper"
 "Wipe That Smile Off Your Face"
 "People Turning On Each Other"
 "Quietly Turning Pages"
 "Origin Of Species"

References

External links

English alternative rock groups